HMS Glatton and her sister ship  were originally built as coastal defence ships for the Royal Norwegian Navy, as  and  respectively. She was requisitioned from Norway at the beginning of World War I, but was not completed until 1918 although she had been launched over three years earlier. On 16 September 1918, before she had even gone into action, she suffered a large fire in one of her 6-inch magazines, and had to be scuttled to prevent an explosion of her main magazines that would have devastated Dover. Her wreck was partially salvaged in 1926, and moved into a position in the northeastern end of the harbour where it would not obstruct traffic. It was subsequently buried by landfill underneath the current car ferry terminal.

Background
Bjørgvin was ordered by Norway in 1913 to supplement the older  and  classes of coastal defence ships. She would have been known in Norway as P/S Bjørgvin; P/S stands for Panserskip ("armoured ship"), while Bjørgvin was the old name for the Norwegian city of Bergen. However, when World War I broke out, the Royal Navy requisitioned most warships under construction in Britain for foreign powers and refunded the two-thirds of Bjørgvins £370,000 purchase price already paid by the Norwegians.

Construction and description
Bjørgvin was laid down by Armstrong Whitworth at Elswick on 26 May 1913 and launched on 8 August 1914. She was renamed Glatton after an earlier breastwork monitor of 1871. Her completion was greatly delayed by the modifications made by the British, which included modifying the boilers to use both oil and coal and conversion of 12 double-bottom tanks to carry the oil. This work began on 9 January 1915, but was suspended the following May, when it was estimated that only another 10–12 months of work remained, to allow for faster progress to be made on the large light cruisers  and  that were building in Armstrong's Naval Yard downriver. Addition of the bulges cost  in speed, but prevented the extra weight resulting from all of these changes from deepening her draft. She was finally completed on 8 September 1918.

She was armed with two 9.2-inch guns arranged in two single-gun turrets, one each fore and aft. Her secondary armament consisted of four six-inch guns, also in single-gun turrets, two of which superfired over the 9.2-inch turrets. The other two were positioned on each side of the superstructure. One  anti-aircraft gun was mounted on each center-line 6-inch turret. She also carried four 3-pounder and two 2-pounder guns on high-angle mounts.

Fate
After completion, Glatton sailed for Dover on 11 September 1918 to prepare for the offensive planned for later that month. At 6:15 on the evening of 16 September, Glattons midships 6-inch magazine had a low-order explosion that ignited the cordite stored there. Flames shot through the roof of 'Q' turret, starboard midside, and started to spread aft. The ship's captain, Commander N. W. Diggle had been walking along the cliffs with Vice-Admiral Keyes when they heard the explosion and both men quickly returned to the harbour.

Diggle boarded the burning vessel and found that the only surviving officer on board was a junior surgeon. The captain took control of the situation and ordered the opening of the seacocks in the magazines to prevent further explosions. The forward magazines were flooded successfully, but the crew were unable to flood the rear magazines as the flames blocked access to the magazine flooding controls.

Keyes boarded the recently arrived destroyer  once apprised of the danger. He ordered Cossack to torpedo Glatton in an attempt to flood the magazine before it detonated. Cossacks first  torpedo struck the anti-torpedo bulge amidships, but failed to explode because it had been fired too close to Glatton. Her second torpedo blew a hole in Glatton at 7:40, but the torpedo's  warhead was too small to penetrate through her bulge and Glatton remained afloat, still burning. Keyes transferred to the destroyer  and ordered her to fire on Glatton with her  torpedoes at 8:15. They were aimed at the hole blown in Glattons starboard side by Cossacks second torpedo and succeeded in causing Glatton to capsize until her masts and superstructure rested on the harbour bottom and dousing the fire. Casualties were heavy: 60 men were killed outright and 124 were injured of whom 19 later died of their burns. The Antarctic explorer Surgeon Lieutenant-Commander Edward L. Atkinson, although rendered unconscious by the first explosion and burned and blinded, was able to rescue several men before escaping, and was awarded the Albert Medal.

Inquiry
A Court of Enquiry held immediately afterwards found that the explosion had occurred in the midships 6-inch magazine situated between the boiler and engine rooms. The cause was more difficult to establish, but the Court did note that the stokers were in the habit of piling the red-hot clinker and ashes from the boilers against the bulkhead directly adjoining the magazine to cool down before they were sent up the ash ejector. The magazine of Glattons sister ship Gorgon was emptied and examined. The red lead paint on the bulkhead was blistered beneath the lagging and tests at the National Physical Laboratory demonstrated that it had been subject to temperatures of at least . Other tests did reveal that the cork could give off flammable fumes under high heat and pressurized air. While not entirely satisfied with this conclusion it found in April 1919 that "The slow combustion of the cork lagging of the 6-inch midship magazine of the Glatton led to the ignition of the magazine and then to the ignition of the cordite in it and so caused the explosion."

As a precaution, Gorgons lagging was stripped out and replaced with silicate wool, revealing the real cause. Part of the cork was missing and folded newspapers were found in the empty space which were left there by the dockyard workers during construction. Furthermore, a number of rivets were entirely missing which meant that  holes were present, which could have allowed the hot ashes to ignite the newspapers. The forced-draught pressure in the boiler room would have supplied air through the rivet holes, causing the cork to give off flammable gases, and eventually ignite the cordite charges.

Aftermath
Glatton remained in Dover Harbour, an obstruction to shipping, with her hull visible at low tide as the Harbour Board could not afford the £45,000 quoted on average by salvage companies. Finally they asked the Harbourmaster, Captain John Iron, if he could do it for less. He estimated it would cost about £5,000 if he was granted use of the salvage craft already at Dover. The Board accepted his offer and work began in May 1925. Some  of silt were removed from underneath Glatton and her mainmast and superstructure were blasted away from the wreck. The first attempt to lift her began on 2 December 1925 and was successful in breaking the suction holding her to the bottom in combination with the rising tide. That was enough for the first try and the major lifting effort began the following day. Slowly she was moved, taking advantage of the tides, until on 16 March 1926 she was moved to a deep gully next to the western pier of the submarine harbour, close by the shore. The total cost was considerably more than originally estimated, but still far less than that quoted by the salvage companies, at no more than £12,000. There she remains, buried by landfill underneath the current car ferry terminal.

Memorial
A memorial was erected at St Mary's Church and Grange Road cemetery in Gillingham, Kent. The cemetery was used from 1867 until 1973 when the site was largely cleared of memorials to provide a community open space for the local population. Then Woodlands Road Cemetery was used and this is the current site of HMS Glattons Memorial, with the graves of one officer and 56 men.

See also
Edward L. Atkinson awarded the Albert Medal

Notes

References

External links
Gorgon-class monitors (J Rickard, 2007)
Glatton - the Catastrophe and the Salvage (Lorraine Sensicle, 2015)

 

Bjørgvin-class coastal defence ships
Gorgon-class monitors
Ships built in Barrow-in-Furness
1914 ships
Ships sunk by non-combat internal explosions
Maritime incidents in 1918
Maritime disasters in Kent
1918 disasters in the United Kingdom
Ships built by Armstrong Whitworth